Ronald John Wooten (born June 29, 1959) is a former American football player. He played as a guard for seven professional seasons with the New England Patriots in the National Football League (NFL). Wooten attended the University of North Carolina. Wooten is now the president of NovaQuest and the executive vice president of corporate development at Quintiles Transnational.

Career
Wooten received his bachelor's degree in chemistry from the University of North Carolina at Chapel Hill and his master's of business administration from Boston University. He played as an offensive guard from 1981 to 1990 with the New England Patriots of the National Football League (NFL).

From 1994 to 2003, Wooten worked with First Union Securities Corporation (now Wachovia Securities, Inc.) in Charlotte, North Carolina, most recently as Managing Director of Investment Banking, advising corporate clients on mergers and acquisition, as well as corporate finance strategies. Earlier in his career at First Union, Wooten helped formulate the product offerings and delivery channels for the company's capital markets business.  

Wooten now serves as president of NovaQuest and executive vice president of corporate development at Quintiles Transnational Corporation, a position he has held since 2003. Wooten joined the firm in July 2000 as senior vice president of finance, to manage the formation of NovaQuest's predecessor, the PharmaBio Development Group, and to assist with merger and acquisition and corporate finance strategies.

Personal life

Wooten is married to Ann Wooten, also a graduate of University of North Carolina at Chapel Hill. They have two children, who also graduated from University of North Carolina at Chapel Hill. 

In November 2012 Ron opened up a Denny's with former college roommate Donnell Thompson.

References

1959 births
Living people
American football offensive guards
New England Patriots players
North Carolina Tar Heels football players
People from Bourne, Massachusetts
Sportspeople from Barnstable County, Massachusetts
Players of American football from Massachusetts